San Pablo is a town and municipality in the San Marcos department of Guatemala.

Climate

San Pablo has a tropical climate (Köppen: Am).

Geographic location 

San Pablo is surrounded by San Marcos Department municipalities:

See also
 
 
 La Aurora International Airport

References

External links

Municipalities of the San Marcos Department